The interosseous membrane of the leg (middle tibiofibular ligament) extends between the interosseous crests of the tibia and fibula, helps stabilize the Tib-Fib relationship and separates the muscles on the front from those on the back of the leg.

It consists of a thin, aponeurotic joint lamina composed of oblique fibers, which for the most part run downward and lateralward; some few fibers, however, pass in the opposite  direction.

It is broader above than below. Its upper margin does not quite reach the tibiofibular joint, but presents a free concave border, above which is a large, oval aperture for the passage of the anterior tibial vessels to the front of the leg.

In its lower part is an opening for the passage of the anterior peroneal vessels.

It is continuous below with the interosseous ligament of the tibiofibular syndesmosis, and presents numerous perforations for the passage of small vessels.

It is in relation, in front, with the Tibialis anterior, Extensor digitorum longus, Extensor hallucis proprius, Peronæus tertius, and the anterior tibial vessels and deep peroneal nerve; behind, with the Tibialis posterior and Flexor hallucis longus.

Additional images

References

External links
 Diagrams at massagetherapy.com

Lower limb anatomy